The Kuki National Army (KNA) is a Kuki insurgent group active in Northeast India and northwest Myanmar. It is the armed wing of the Kuki National Organisation.

History
The Kuki National Army (KNA) was founded on 24 February 1988 with the goal of creating a separate state administered by the Kuki people in India and Myanmar (Burma). From its formation to 2013, the KNA was involved in 20 armed confrontations with the Tatmadaw (Myanmar Armed Forces).

After the 2010 Burmese general election, pressure from other Kuki organisations forced the KNA to separate its Indian and Burmese wings, the latter of which was renamed and abbreviated KNA(B).

Leadership
 President: Pu Letlam and Pu PS Haokip
 Vice President: Pu Chuchung
 General Secretary: Pi Ngangai
 Joint Secretary: Pu Khupmang
 Defence Secretary: Pu Paulneo
 Information and Publicity Secretary: Pu Seigin
 Home Secretary: Pu Michael Sasat
 Head of Intelligence: Pu Letkholun
 Secretary of External Affairs and Liaison: Pu Boipu
 Secretary of Human Rights Law and Analysis Wing: Pi Lalam

Areas of operation
The KNA operates two armed wings, one in India and one in Myanmar (known as KNA(B).Total cadre strength 2500+

India
 Northeast India
 Manipur

Myanmar (Burma)
 Chin State
 Ton Zang Township
 Sagaing Region
 Hkamti Township
 Homalin Township
 Leshi Township
 Tamu Township
 Myothit

References

Rebel groups in India
Rebel groups in Myanmar
Paramilitary organisations based in Myanmar
Secessionist organizations
1988 establishments in India
Separatism in Myanmar